Yan Song (1480–1567), courtesy name Weizhong (惟中), pseudonym Jiexi (介溪), was a Chinese politician and regent of the Ming dynasty. He was notorious for being corrupt and for dominating the Ming government for two decades as Grand Secretary during the reign of the Jiajing Emperor.

Biography

Early life
Yan Song was born in Fenyi, modern-day Jiangxi province. His father, a scholar who had repeatedly failed the imperial examination, put great effort into educating his son from childhood. A talented scholar, he passed the village examinations at the age of 10, and acquired the jinshi degree at the age of 25, being inducted into the imperial secretariat (Hanlin Academy) as an editor.

His early career was quickly cut short by a severe illness which forced Yan Song to return to his hometown, though this proved to be a blessing in disguise, since it kept him away from the imperial court just as it was under the domination of powerful eunuch Liu Jin.

Yan Song returned to Beijing not long after the fall of Liu Jin, returning to work in the Hanlin Academy in both Beijing and Nanjing.

Senior Grand Secretary

Yan Song was the Senior Grand Secretary under the Jiajing Emperor from 1544 to 1545 and from 1548 to 1562. Yan was a close ally of Zhao Wenhua. During his second term as Senior Grand Secretary, he and his son  dominated court politics with the tacit consent of the fatuous monarch who shirked his responsibilities as emperor and devoted much of his time to sensual pleasures and Taoist practices. Yan Song's wealth is said to have been so great as to have been comparable to that of the emperor. He is also well known for his corruption and had been known to openly sell government positions for cash during the Jiajing Emperor's reign, but his corruption and treachery created many political opponents. In order to suppress dissent, he had prominent critics such as Yang Jisheng imprisoned and executed. Yan Song was finally disgraced in his later years and died in poverty not long after that, while his son, Yan Shifan, was executed for collaborating with the wokou pirates who invaded Chinese coastal provinces at the time.

He was the subject of the Chinese opera called Beating Yan Song (打嚴嵩 Dǎ Yán Sōng).

See also
 List of Premiers of China

References

1480 births
1567 deaths
Senior Grand Secretaries of the Ming dynasty
People from Xinyu